Wisk'achani (Aymara wisk'acha a rodent, -ni a suffix to indicate ownership, "the one with the viscacha (or viscachas)", Hispanicized spelling Viscachani) is a  mountain in the eastern extensions of the Cordillera Real in the Andes of Bolivia. It is situated in the La Paz Department, Sud Yungas Province, Irupana Municipality. Wisk'achani lies west of the Illimani massif, northeast of Link'u Link'u.

References 

Mountains of La Paz Department (Bolivia)